Slimnic is a commune located in Sibiu County, Transylvania, Romania. It is composed of five villages: Albi, Pădureni, Ruși, Slimnic and Veseud. Slimnic and Ruși villages have fortified churches. Slimnic village also has a medieval citadel.

References

Communes in Sibiu County
Localities in Transylvania